Roman Kollar (born 22 September 1974) is a Slovak wrestler. He competed in the men's freestyle 52 kg at the 1996 Summer Olympics.

References

External links
 

1974 births
Living people
Slovak male sport wrestlers
Olympic wrestlers of Turkey
Wrestlers at the 1996 Summer Olympics
Sportspeople from Dunajská Streda